Francisco Xavier Berganza Escorza (born 19 March 1967) is a Mexican politician affiliated with the PANAL. As of 2013 he served as Senator of the LX and LXI Legislatures of the Mexican Congress representing Hidalgo. He also served as Deputy during the LVII Legislature.

References

1967 births
Living people
Politicians from Hidalgo (state)
Members of the Senate of the Republic (Mexico)
Members of the Chamber of Deputies (Mexico)
New Alliance Party (Mexico) politicians
21st-century Mexican politicians